Gates Hall can refer to several structures named after Bill Gates, other members of the Gates family, or his former wife, Melinda French Gates:

 Bill & Melinda Gates Hall, at Cornell University, in Ithaca, New York, U.S.
 Mary Gates Hall, home of the University of Washington Information School, in Seattle, Washington, U.S.
 William H. Gates Hall (Seattle) at the University of Washington, in Seattle, Washington, U.S.

See also
 Bill & Melinda Gates Center for Computer Science & Engineering at the University of Washington, in Seattle, Washington, U.S.
 Bill and Melinda Gates Computer Science Complex at the University of Texas at Austin, in Austin, Texas, U.S.
 Gates Center for Computer Science at Carnegie Mellon University, Pittsburgh, Pennsylvania, U.S.
 Gates Computer Science Building, Stanford, in Stanford, California, U.S.
 William Gates Building (disambiguation)
 William Gates Building, Cambridge at University of Cambridge, U.K.
 William H. Gates Building at Massachusetts Institute of Technology, in Cambridge, Massachusetts, U.S.
 Gates Hall, Pultneyville, New York